Minuscule 529 (in the Gregory-Aland numbering), ε 149 (in Soden's numbering), is a Greek minuscule manuscript of the New Testament, on a parchment. Palaeographically it has been assigned to the 12th century. 
Scrivener labeled it by number 484. It was adapted for liturgical use.

Description 

The codex contains a complete text of the four Gospels on 362 parchment leaves (size ). It is written in one column per page, 20 lines per page.

There is also a division according to the smaller Ammonian Sections, but there is no references to the Eusebian Canons).

Text 

The Greek text of the codex is a representative of the Byzantine text-type. Hermann von Soden classified it to the textual family Kx. Aland placed it in Category V.

According to the Claremont Profile Method it represents the textual family Kx in Luke 1 and Luke 10; in Luke 20 it has mixed Byzantine text. It creates textual pair with minuscule 2694.

History 

The manuscript once belonged to Humphrey Wanley (1672–1726). In 1776 the manuscript was bought by Samuel Smalbroke from Lichfield and it was presented by him to the Bodleian Library in 1800.

The manuscript was added to the list of New Testament minuscule manuscripts by F. H. A. Scrivener (484) and C. R. Gregory (529). Gregory saw it in 1883.

It is currently housed at the Bodleian Library (MS. Auct. D. inf. 2. 21) in Oxford.

See also 

 List of New Testament minuscules
 Biblical manuscript
 Textual criticism

References

Further reading 

 

Greek New Testament minuscules
12th-century biblical manuscripts
Bodleian Library collection